FabricLive.03 is a DJ mix compilation album by DJ Hype, as part of the FabricLive Mix Series.

Track listing

References

External links
Fabric: FabricLive.03
Allmusic: [ FabricLive.03]
Resident Advisor: FabricLive.03 review

DJ Hype albums
2002 compilation albums